Virtuoso No. 3 is a 1977 album by American jazz guitarist Joe Pass. It was re-issued in 1992 on CD by Original Jazz Classics.

Virtuoso No. 3 differs from Virtuoso and Virtuoso No. 2 in that it contains all original material instead of jazz standards. The track "Paco de Lucia" is named after the noted flamenco composer and guitarist.

Reception

In his Allmusic review, critic Scott Yanow wrote "There are more ballads than usual in a Pass solo showcase, but there is enough variety to hold one's interest..."

Track listing
All songs by Joe Pass.
"Off Beat" – 4:47
"Trinidad" –  6:11
"Nina's Blues" – 5:15
"Sevenths" –  4:12
"Ninths" – 5:21
"Dissonance, No. 1" – 1:53
"Minor Detail" – 6:01
"Paco de Lucia" – 5:52
"Sultry" – 4:25
"Passanova" – 4:29
"Pasta Blues" – 4:36
"Dissonance, No. 2" – 3:04

Personnel
Joe Pass - guitar
Norman Granz – producer
Val Valentin – engineer

References

External links
Joe Pass Memorial Hall

1977 albums
Joe Pass albums
Albums produced by Norman Granz
Pablo Records albums
Instrumental albums